Petrov Val is a town in Kamyshinsky District of Volgograd Oblast, Russia, located on the left bank of the Ilovlya River (a tributary of the Don),  north of Volgograd, the administrative center of the oblast. Population:

History
Early settlement in Petrov Val is date back to Don–Volga portage.the city is in the path of shortest path between Volga and Don River. Peter the Great decided to construct a canal between, Petrov Val Canal between Ilovlya and the Kamyshinka Rivers, and the city has been named in his honor. It was granted urban-type settlement status in 1949 and town status in 1988.

Administrative and municipal status
Within the framework of administrative divisions, it is, together with the settlement of Avilovsky, incorporated within Kamyshinsky District as the town of district significance of Petrov Val. As a municipal division, the town of district significance of Petrov Val is incorporated within Kamyshinsky Municipal District as Petrov Val Urban Settlement.

References

Notes

Sources

Cities and towns in Volgograd Oblast